Ghazala Saad Rafique  is a Pakistani politician who served as a member of the Provincial Assembly of the Punjab. She is the wife of former Minister for Railways Khawaja Saad Rafique.

References

Punjab MPAs 2008–2013
Pakistan Muslim League (N) MPAs (Punjab)
People from Lahore
Living people
Year of birth missing (living people)